This page provides supplementary chemical data on ethylene glycol.

Material Safety Data Sheet  

The handling of this chemical may incur notable safety precautions. It is highly recommend that you seek the Material Safety Datasheet (MSDS) for this chemical from a reliable source and follow its directions.

Science Stuff
Mallinckrodt Baker.

Structure and properties

Thermodynamic properties

Vapor pressure of liquid

Table data obtained from CRC Handbook of Chemistry and Physics, 44th ed.

Freezing point of aqueous solutions

Table obtained from Lange's Handbook of Chemistry, 10th ed. Specific gravity is referenced to water at 15.6 °C.

See also

Distillation data

Spectral data

References

 

Chemical data pages
Chemical data pages cleanup

es:Etilenglicol página de datos